Paraknoxia is a genus of flowering plants belonging to the family Rubiaceae.

Its native range is Central African Republic to Eastern and Southern Tropical Africa.

Species
Species:
 Paraknoxia parviflora (Stapf ex Verdc.) Verdc. ex Bremek.

References

Rubiaceae
Rubiaceae genera